Scandal Sheet is a 1931 American crime film directed by John Cromwell and written by Oliver H.P. Garrett, Vincent Lawrence and Max Marcin. The film stars George Bancroft, Kay Francis, Clive Brook, Regis Toomey, Lucien Littlefield, Gilbert Emery and Harry Beresford. The film was released on January 31, 1931, by Paramount Pictures.

Plot
Newspaper editor Mark Flint cares about only two things, reporting a big story, no matter whose life it adversely affects, and Edith, his wife. He is unaware that Edith, bored by him, has been having a romantic affair with Noel Adams, a banker.

Adams gives a 24-hour deadline to Edith to leave her husband or end the affair. He books passage on a steamship and packs his bags. But after a crisis develops that could ruin his bank, Flint finds out, confronts Adams and, seeing his luggage, mistakenly believes Adams is fleeing the country. He prints the story without giving Adams a chance to manage the crisis at the bank.

Although his journalistic coups please Franklin, the newspaper's owner, Flint is asked by Franklin if he would be willing to publish a photograph that would hurt a colleague. Flint says yes, whereupon Franklin shows him a picture of his wife and Adams together. An enraged Flint murders Adams, turns himself in and is sentenced to Sing Sing, where he ends up running the prison's newspaper.

Cast 
George Bancroft as Mark Flint
Kay Francis as Edith Flint
Clive Brook as Noel Adams
Regis Toomey as Regan
Lucien Littlefield as Charles McCloskey
Gilbert Emery as Franklin 
Harry Beresford as Egbert Bertram Arnold
Mary Foy as Mrs. Wilson
Jackie Searl as Little Wilson Boy
Fred Kelsey as Detective Sgt. Vincent Molloy

References

External links 
 

1931 films
1931 crime drama films
American black-and-white films
American crime drama films
1930s English-language films
Films about adultery in the United States
Films about journalists
Films directed by John Cromwell
Paramount Pictures films
Films scored by Karl Hajos
1930s American films